Paschiodes mesoleucalis is a moth in the family Crambidae. It was described by George Hampson in 1913. It is found in the Democratic Republic of the Congo, Ethiopia, Kenya, Rwanda, South Africa (Eastern Cape, Gauteng), Uganda and Zimbabwe.

References

Moths described in 1913
Pyraustinae